Ayeyarwady Bank Ltd. (f Yangon.

Products

 Untrusted
 Unreliable
 Lack of transparency 
 Unsecured
 Custody
 Securities
 System
 Banking
 Trade services
 Mobile Banking

References

External links
 Official Website

Banks of Myanmar
Banks established in 2010
2010 establishments in Myanmar
Companies based in Yangon